The Brunei Civil War was a civil war fought in the Bruneian Empire from 1660 to 1673.

Causes 

During the reign of the thirteenth Sultan Muhammad Ali, there was a disagreement between the son of the Sultan, Pengiran Muda ("prince") Bongsu and Pengiran Muda Alam, the son of Pengiran Abdul Mubin over the results of a cockfight which Pengiran Muda Bungsu lost. His defeat was jeered by Pengiran Muda Alam. In his rage, Bongsu killed Pengiran Muda Alam and escaped from the scene. In revenge, Abdul Hakkul Mubin and his followers garroted Sultan Muhammad Ali. Abdul Hakkul Mubin then made himself the fourteenth Sultan and took the title of "Sultan Abdul Hakkul Mubin". He tried to appease the previous Sultan's followers by appointing Muhammad Ali's grandson, Muhyiddin as the new Bendahara ("Chief Minister"). After a while, however, Muhammad Ali's supporters took revenge by convincing Bendahara Muhyiddin to stand up against Abdul Hakkul Mubin. Bendahara Muhyddin initially refused, but then later agreed to do so. His supporters started making disturbances in the form of poking spears into palaces and homes. Sultan Abdul Hakkul Mubin then moved his palace to Chermin Island under the advice of Muhyiddin with the intent to wait the crisis out. After he left, however, Muhyiddin declared himself the fifteenth sultan. A battle between the two competing Sultans then ensued. Thus, the civil war of Brunei started.

Fighting and outcome 
During the civil war, Abdul Hakkul Mubin fled to Kinarut (in present-day Papar, Sabah, Malaysia) where, he stayed there for ten years, repelling repeated attacks by Sultan Muhyiddin. They returned to Brunei after a final attack by Muhyiddin's forces in which they failed to defeat Abdul Hakkul Mubin. Muhyiddin was concerned that the civil war was dragging on too long and asked the help of the sultan of Sulu to send forces. He reportedly promised the land of eastern Sabah as a reward for the Sulu's assistance. Muhyiddin eventually emerged victorious. Abdul Hakkul Mubin was killed in the civil war and later buried at the royal burial ground on the island. It is not clear to historians whether Muhyiddin asked for Sulu’s help in the civil war. The Sultan of Sulu at that time on his part, however, claimed that he was asked by Brunei to help and was promised eastern Sabah as a reward. Sultan of Sulu claimed eastern Sabah as a gift from the Sultan of Brunei, for the Tausugs' despite that they never really help during the civil war (an event which traced the roots of the North Borneo dispute between Malaysia and the Philippines in the present-day).

See also 
 Brunei
 Sultanate of Sulu
 History of Sabah
 Sultan of Brunei

References 

Civil wars involving the states and peoples of Asia
History of Brunei
History of Sabah
Wars involving Brunei
Wars of succession involving the states and peoples of Asia